The 2014 Clemson Tigers women's soccer team represented Clemson University during the 2014 NCAA Division I women's soccer season.  The Tigers were led by head coach Ed Radwanski, in his fourth season.  They played home games at Riggs Field.

Roster

Updated November 13, 2015

Schedule

|-
!colspan=6 style=""| Exhibition

|-
!colspan=6 style=""| Regular season

|-
!colspan=6 style=""| NCAA Tournament

References

External links
 Official website

Clemson
Clemson women's soccer
Clemson
Clemson Tigers women's soccer seasons